Paramelanauster is a genus of longhorn beetles of the subfamily Lamiinae, containing the following species:

 Paramelanauster bimaculatus Breuning, 1936
 Paramelanauster flavosparsus Breuning, 1936
 Paramelanauster variegatus Gressitt, 1940

References

Lamiini